Afraik Kaejtan "Chucks" Nwoko (born 21 November 1978) is a former professional footballer who played at both professional and international levels as a midfielder. Born in Nigeria, he represented the Malta national team. He is currently the under-19 coach for Maltese First Division side Balzan Youths.

Playing career
Born in Lagos, Nigeria, Nwoko began his senior career in 1995 with Julius Berger. He joined Maltese team Birkirkara later that year, and after a loan spell in Bulgaria with CSKA Sofia in 2001, also played for Marsaxlokk, Sliema Wanderers and Qormi, retiring in 2009.

International career
After marrying a Maltese national – therefore becoming eligible to play for the Malta national football team, Nwoko made his international debut in 1998. He made a total of 46 international appearances, scoring one goal, until 2003.

Personal life
His son Kyrian is also a footballer.

References

External links
 Chucks Nwoko at MaltaFootball.com

1978 births
Living people
Association football midfielders
People with acquired Maltese citizenship
Maltese footballers
Malta international footballers
Maltese people of Nigerian descent
Nigerian emigrants to Malta
Nigerian footballers
Birkirkara F.C. players
PFC CSKA Sofia players
Marsaxlokk F.C. players
Sliema Wanderers F.C. players
Qormi F.C. players
Maltese expatriate footballers
Expatriate footballers in Bulgaria
Nigerian expatriate sportspeople in Malta
Nigerian expatriate sportspeople in Bulgaria
First Professional Football League (Bulgaria) players
Nigerian expatriate footballers
Maltese Premier League players
Expatriate footballers in Malta
Association football coaches